Bashful Peak is a mountain in the U.S. state of Alaska, located in Chugach State Park. At , Bashful is the highest peak in Chugach State Park, and the highest peak in the Municipality of Anchorage. The peak carries snow year-round and several small glaciers hang from its steep western face.

The peak was named in 1958 by members of the Mountaineering Club of Alaska because "it is often hidden by other peaks, ridges, or clouds."

Climbing
Bashful Peak is a challenging climb due to its height, loose rock, remoteness, exposure, and the chaotic weather of the Chugach Mountains, which includes year-round snowstorms. Bashful Peak sees very few visitors, and there are no trails up the mountain itself. Climbers typically start at the Eklutna Lake trailhead, hike up the East fork of the Eklutna River, climb the beginning of Stivers Gully on Bold Peak, climb out of the gully and cross a small valley, and ascend Bashful Peak via its southern ridge.

See also

List of mountain peaks of North America
List of mountain peaks of the United States
List of mountain peaks of Alaska
List of Ultras of the United States

References

External links

"Bashful Peak, Alaska" on Peakbagger
AK Mountain blog post by William Finley, "Bashful Peak", a trip report with photos.

Mountains of Alaska
Mountains of Anchorage, Alaska